The Saplings is a 1972 Soviet comedy film directed by Rezo Chkheidze. It was entered into the 8th Moscow International Film Festival where Ramaz Chkhikvadze won the award for Best Actor.

Cast
 Ramaz Chkhikvadze as Luka
 Kakhi Kavsadze as Daviti
 Mishiko Meskhi as Kakha
 Meri Qoreli as Elisabed, grandma
 Sesilia Takaishvili as Tsitsino
 Zeinab Botsvadze as Mother
 Zura Qapianidze as Cart driver
 Mikheil Vashadze as Dateshidze
 Serafim Strelkov as Mr. Fletcher

References

External links
 

1972 films
1972 comedy films
Soviet comedy films
Soviet-era films from Georgia (country)
Georgian-language films
Soviet black-and-white films
Films directed by Revaz Chkheidze
Comedy films from Georgia (country)
Black-and-white films from Georgia (country)